Central universities in India are public universities established by an Act of Parliament and are under the purview of the Department of Higher Education in the Ministry of Education, except for nine universities which are under the purview of other ministries. In general, universities in India are recognised by the University Grants Commission (UGC), which draws its power from the University Grants Commission Act, 1956. In addition, 15 Professional Councils are established, controlling different aspects of accreditation and coordination. Central universities, in addition, are covered by the Central Universities Act, 2009, which regulates their purpose, powers, governance etc., and established 12 new universities. 

 The list of central universities published by the UGC includes 54 central universities.

Universities by state
The region with the most central universities in India is Delhi with seven universities. There are central universities in all of the states of India except Goa. Of the union territories, there are central universities in Delhi, Jammu and Kashmir, Ladakh and Puducherry.

List of central universities in India
The establishment Act of universities established by the Central Universities Act, 2009, or after it, is noted. All other universities were established by a specific Act.

Notes

Upcoming and proposed central universities
In August 2021, India's education minister Dharmendra Pradhan introduced a bill in the Parliament of India to amend the Central Universities Act, 2009 which will lead to a central university in the Union territory of Ladakh. Earlier in July, the Union Council of Ministers approved the setting up the new university for ₹750 crore. The new campus will come up at village Khalatse, located in between Leh and Kargil. , the university is still not operational.

See also
 List of universities in India
 List of state universities in India
 List of deemed universities in India
 List of private universities in India
 List of autonomous higher education institutes in India

References

External links 
Central Universities per state